Shay Sade (born 16 April 1990) is an Israeli football defender.

Club career
Sade started playing football with the boys team of Hapoel Hod HaSharon, before joining Maccabi Kishronot Hadera in the Women's League at the age of 14. After a year in Hadera, Sade joined F.C. Ramat HaSharon when the team was established and played with the team until 2009. Sade played between 2009 and 2014 at ASA Tel Aviv University, winning 5 championship titles and 3 national cups with the club, as well as playing in the UEFA Women's Champions League. In 2014, Sade returned to F.C. Ramat HaSharon.

In 2012, Sade started attending Youngstown State University, playing for the women's soccer team. In 2013, she had transferred to University of Texas at Brownsville.

International career
Sade played it first match for the national team in 2009, against Belarus, and had played in 25 matches. Between 2006 and 2008 played for the U-19 national team, appearing in 11 matches.

Honours
Championships (5):
With ASA Tel Aviv University: 2009–10, 2010–11 , 2011–12 , 2012–13, 2013–14,2018–19
Cup (2):
With ASA Tel Aviv University: 2010–11, 2011–12, 2013–14,2018–19

References

External links

1990 births
Living people
Israeli Jews
Israeli women's footballers
Israel women's international footballers
Maccabi Kishronot Hadera F.C. players
F.C. Ramat HaSharon players
ASA Tel Aviv University players
Women's association football defenders
Youngstown State Penguins women's soccer players
Footballers from Hod HaSharon